Windsor and Royal Borough Museum is a local history museum, exploring the history of the town of Windsor and the Royal Borough of Windsor & Maidenhead, in the English county of Berkshire. It is accommodated within Windsor Guildhall which is a Grade I listed building. The museum is managed as part of the local authority of the Royal Borough of Windsor & Maidenhead.

The first museum exhibition was opened in Windsor Guildhall in 1951 as part of the Festival of Britain celebrations by Princess Elizabeth. The Queen returned to the building in 2011.

References

External links 
Windsor and Royal Borough Museum – RBWM Website
Windsor and Royal Borough Museum – Windsor & Maidenhead Tourist Information UK
WindsorMuseum.org.uk – museum collection and blog

Art museums and galleries in Berkshire
Museums of ancient Rome in the United Kingdom
Local museums in Berkshire